Nador is a province in the Oriental Region of Morocco. Its population in 2014 was 564,943.

It is situated east from Driouch Province and west from Berkane Province.

Major cities and towns

The major cities and towns are:

 Al Aaroui
 Beni Ensar / Aït Nsar
 Bni Chiker
 Farkhana
 Ihddaden
 Jaadar
 Kariat Arekmane
 Nador
 Ras El Ma
 Segangan/ Zeghanghane
 Selouane
 Tiztoutine
 Touima
 Zaio

Subdivisions
The province is divided administratively into the following:

References 

 
Nador